Raúl Zumbano (14 October 1925 – 8 November 2001) was a Brazilian boxer. He competed in the men's lightweight event at the 1948 Summer Olympics.

References

1925 births
2001 deaths
Brazilian male boxers
Olympic boxers of Brazil
Boxers at the 1948 Summer Olympics
Sportspeople from São Paulo
Lightweight boxers